Amalfi was a  armored cruiser of the Italian Royal Navy built in the first decade of the 20th century. During the Italo-Turkish War of 1911–1912, Amalfi operated with the Italian fleet off Tripoli in September 1911 and participated in the amphibious landings at Derna in October. In April 1912, Amalfi and sister ship  led the way in attacks on Turkish forts in the Dardanelles. After the rest of the fleet retired later in the month, the pair of armored cruisers remained in the area to attack Turkish communications facilities. After the Treaty of Lausanne signed in October 1912 ended the war, Amalfi escorted the Italian king and queen on the royal yacht to Germany and Sweden during a 1913 visit.

At the outbreak of World War I in August 1914, Italy declined to join her Triple Alliance partners, Germany and Austria-Hungary. The country was eventually persuaded to side with the Entente Powers and declared war on neighboring Austria-Hungary in May 1915. After the Austro-Hungarian Navy raided the Italian coast with relative impunity in May and June, Amalfi, Pisa, and two other armored cruisers were sent to Venice to thwart future sorties by the Austrians. Shortly after their arrival, the ships were sent—in a show of force—to patrol near the main Austrian naval base at Pola on the night of 6/7 July 1915. During Amalfis return from that mission, she was torpedoed by Austro-Hungarian submarine  (in fact  flying the Austro-Hungarian flag, since Germany and Italy were not yet at war) and sunk with the loss of 67 men. Amalfis loss caused the Italians to keep the other armored cruisers at Venice in port for most of the next year before they were eventually relocated.

Design and description 
She had twin propeller shafts powered by two vertical triple-expansion steam engines. The steam engines were fed from 22 coal-fired Belleville boilers.

The main armament of the Pisa-class ships consisted of four Cannone da 254/45 V Modello 1906 guns in twin-gun turrets fore and aft of the superstructure. The ships mounted eight Cannone da 190/45 V Modello 1906 in four twin-gun turrets, two in each side amidships, as their secondary armament. For defense against torpedo boats, they carried 16 quick-firing (QF) Cannone da 76/50 V Modello 1908 guns and eight QF Cannone da 47/40 V Modello 1908 guns. They were also equipped with three submerged  torpedo tubes. During World War I, Pisas 76 and 47 mm guns were replaced by twenty 76/40 guns; six of these were anti-aircraft guns.

Construction and career
Work began on the pair of Pisa-class ships in August 1904, nearly a year before the keel of Amalfi, named after the eponymous city, was laid down on 24 July 1905 at the Cantieri navali Odero shipyard in Sestri Ponente. It was nearly three years before Amalfi was launched on 5 May 1908. The ship was completed on 1 September 1909, just over four years after her keel was laid.

Italo-Turkish War 

Amalfi and sister ship Pisa both entered service in 1909, but there is little information in sources on their activities until the 1911 Italo-Turkish War. Five days later, Amalfi and several of the other ships were seen taking on coal at Malta, before heading on to blockade Tripoli.

On 2 October, a division headed by the battleship  relieved Amalfis groups in blockade duty, allowing them to proceed to the east to join the main Italian fleet. Napoli, Amalfi, and Pisa were joined by the recently commissioned armored cruiser , three destroyers, and two torpedo boats. The group escorted several Italian transports that arrived off Derna on 15 October. After negotiations for a surrender of the town fell apart, Pisa shelled the barracks and a fort. There was no return fire from Derna, so a boat with offers of a truce was sent in. When it was greeted by a volley of rifle fire Amalfi and the other armored cruisers opened fire on the town with their  guns and, according to a contemporary account, "completely destroyed" the town in 30 minutes time. A landing party dispatched at 14:00 was unable to reach the shore because of rough seas and gunfire from the shore. Amalfi and company then shelled the beach until 16:00. Weather conditions prevented a landing until the 18th, when 1,500 men took possession of the Derna.

The squadron was initially destined for Tripoli, but was diverted to the Aegean Sea to bombard the Turkish coast. The 2nd Squadron—consisting of battleships  (squadron flagship), Benedetto Brin, and Emanuele Filiberto; and armored cruisers Francesco Ferrucio, Varese, and Giuseppe Garibaldi—sailed from Tobruk and Augusta at the same time. The two squadrons rendezvoused at Stampalia on 17 April. At 06:30, Pisa and Amalfi steamed into the Dardanelles in advance of the Italian fleet in an attempt to draw out the Turkish fleet. Official Italian reports claimed that no ships were hit and specifically rebutted Turkish claims that Varese had been set on fire, but a summary in The New York Times reports that Varese was hit twice. On 19 April, the Italian fleet departed for home, but left Amalfi, Pisa, and an assortment of smaller craft to continue destroying telegraph stations and cutting cables.

One other action of note involving Amalfi occurred on 28 April when a party of 250 men recruited from her complement and that of Pisa took the Turkish garrison on the island of Astropalia. The 1912 Treaty of Lausanne that ended the war was signed on 18 October.

Interwar period 
In the period between the end of the Italo-Turkish War in 1912 and Italy's entry into the First World War in 1915, Amalfi is mentioned in several news accounts that offer hints of her peace-time activities. In June 1913, Amalfi escorted King Victor Emmanuel III and his wife, Queen Elena, on the royal yacht Trinacria to the annual regatta at Kiel, Germany. While there, Victor Emmanuel met with Kaiser Wilhelm II, to discuss—it was speculated in a contemporary news report—the ongoing Balkan War. After departing from Kiel, Amalfi escorted the King and Queen on Trinacria to their next stop at Stockholm.

By November, Amalfi was back in Italian waters when Admiral Cattolica, the former Italian Minister of the Marine, and the captains of Amalfi and the battleship  greeted United States Navy Admiral Charles J. Badger at Naples on his flagship, . During the Wyomings stay, one stop on the battleship's 1913 Mediterranean tour, Badger returned the visits and toured Amalfi as part of his courtesy calls.

First World War 
At the outbreak of the First World War in August 1914, Italy declined to join its Triple Alliance partners Germany and Austria-Hungary when they declared war against the Entente Powers, opting instead to remain neutral. Pressure from the United Kingdom and France swayed Italy to sign the secret Treaty of London on 26 April 1915. In the agreement, Italy promised to leave the Triple Alliance and declare war against its former allies within a month in return for territorial gains after the end of the war.

At the beginning of May, Amalfi was part of the squadron headquartered at Brindisi that included six pre-dreadnought battleships—, Vittorio Emanuele, Roma, Napoli, Benedetto Brin, and Ammiraglio di Saint Bon—and four armored cruisers—Pisa, San Marco, and Amalfi herself.

After Italy's declaration of war against Austria-Hungary on 23 May, Admiral Anton Haus, the fleet commander of the Austro-Hungarian Navy sortied his fleet to bombard the Italian coast on the night of 23/24 May in an attempt to disrupt the Italian mobilization. Of the many targets, Ancona was hardest hit, with disruptions to the town's gas, electric, and telephone service; the city's stockpiles of coal and oil were left in flames. All of the Austrian ships safely returned to port, making it seem that they had been able to attack with impunity, putting political pressure on the Regia Marina from Rome. When the Austrians resumed attacks on the Italian coast in mid-June, Italian Admiral Paolo Thaon di Revel responded by sending Amalfi and the other armored cruisers at Brindisi—the navy's newest—to Venice to supplement the older ships already there. Historian Lawrence Sondhaus argues that the arrival of the four fast armored cruisers in Venice should have been a major deterrent against future Austrian coastal raids, but concedes that they ended up becoming more inviting targets for Austrian U-boats instead.

Sinking 
Shortly after the arrival of the quartet of cruisers at Venice, Amalfi participated in a "reconnaissance in force" mission near the Austro-Hungarian port of Pula on the night of 6/7 July 1915. U-26—in actuality the German submarine UB-14, marked as an Austrian vessel and flying the Austrian flag since Italy and Germany were not at war—was under the command of Oberleutnant zur See Heino von Heimburg, and on her first patrol.

Amalfi immediately began listing to port and, after initial damage control efforts proved fruitless, her commander ordered the ship evacuated. The cruiser sank less than 30 minutes after she was torpedoed. Distress calls were answered by other ships of the division which rescued a large number of the ship's complement. The loss of men was reported as about 200 at the time, but later reports list only 67 fatalities. Amalfi was among the largest ships sunk by U-boats during the war. As a result of Amalfis sinking, sister ship Pisa and the other pair of armored cruisers at Venice rarely ventured out of port for most of the next year, and were eventually transferred to Valona in April 1916.

References

Bibliography

External links

 Amalfi (1908) Marina Militare website

1908 ships
Pisa-class cruisers
Maritime incidents in 1915
Ships built in Genoa
Ships sunk by Austro-Hungarian submarines
Ships sunk by German submarines in World War I
World War I cruisers of Italy
World War I shipwrecks in the Adriatic Sea